Park U-hui (born 30 May 1980) is a South Korean swimmer. She competed in three events at the 1996 Summer Olympics.

References

External links
 

1980 births
Living people
South Korean female butterfly swimmers
Olympic swimmers of South Korea
Swimmers at the 1996 Summer Olympics
Place of birth missing (living people)